Arthur George Atkinson (2 April 1878 – 7 August 1943) was an Australian rules footballer who played for the Melbourne Football Club in the Victorian Football League (VFL).

Notes

External links 

 

1878 births
1943 deaths
Australian rules footballers from Victoria (Australia)
Melbourne Football Club players